"The Spirit of the Hawk" is a song by Swedish musical group Rednex released from their second album, Farm Out (2000). The lyrics include the spoken lines "My people, some of them, have run away to the hills, and have no shelter, no food. No one knows where they are. Hear me, my chiefs! I am tired; my heart is sick and sad. I will fight no more.", taken from Chief Joseph's famous speech.

Released in 2000, the song topped the charts of Austria and Germany while also reaching the top 10 in Sweden and Switzerland. The track is certified triple gold in Germany, platinum in Austria, and gold in Sweden and Switzerland. In 2010, "The Spirit of the Hawk" was ranked as Germany's ninth-most-successful hit of the 2000s decade.

Track listings
European CD single
 "The Spirit of the Hawk" (F.A.F. radio mix) – 4:03
 "The Spirit of the Hawk" (instrumental) – 4:03

European maxi-CD single
 "The Spirit of the Hawk" (F.A.F. radio mix) – 4:03
 "The Spirit of the Hawk" (instrumental) – 4:03
 "The Spirit of the Hawk" (F.A.F.'s "Heap Bigg" Remix) – 5:57
 "Ranger Jack" – 4:17

Charts

Weekly charts

Year-end charts

Decade-end charts

Certifications

Release history

References

2000 singles
Jive Records singles
Number-one singles in Austria
Number-one singles in Germany
Rednex songs
Songs written by Axel Breitung